The 2010 European Under-18 Rugby Union Championship was the seventh annual international rugby union competition for Under 18 national rugby union teams in Europe. The event was organised by rugby's European governing body, the FIRA – Association of European Rugby (FIRA-AER). The competition was contested by 24 men's junior national teams and was held in late March and early April 2010. It was hosted by the Italian region of Veneto, with the final played at the home ground of Benetton Treviso.

The tournament was won by France, who won its fifth European championship and its fourth in a row, with Ireland finishing runners-up.

It was sponsored by French company Justin Bridou and therefore officially called the 2010 Justin Bridou European Under-18 Rugby Union Championship.

Overview

History
The European Under-18 Rugby Union Championship was first held in 2004, in Treviso, Italy. It replaced the previously held European Under-18 Emergent Nations Championship, which had first been held in 2000. The first championship in 2004 was won by France.

The following two championships, held in Lille, France, in 2005 and again in Treviso in 2006, were won by England. Alternating between France and Italy, the next four championships were held in Biarritz, Treviso again, Toulon and once more in Treviso in 2010. All four were taken out by France, but of Europes top rugby playing nations, England, Wales and Scotland did not take part in the latest edition.

Format
The championship, similar to previous editions, was organised in an A, B and C Division, with A being the highest and C the lowest. Each division consisted of eight teams and each team played three competition games, with a quarter final, semi final and final/placing game.

The quarter finals were played according to a seeding list, with the winners moving on to the first to fourth place semi finals while the losers would enter the fifth to eighth place semi finals.

The winners of the semi finals one to four would play in the division final while the losers would play for third place. Similarly, the winners of the fifth to eighth semi finals would play for fifth place while the losers would play for seventh.

The winner of the A division was crowned European champions while the eighth placed team would be relegated to the B division. Similarly, the winner of B and C division would move up a division for 2011 while the last placed teams would be relegated. This meant, France was crowned European champions while Romania finished on the relegation spot. Portugal won the B division and earned promotion while the Ukraine was relegated and replaced by Sweden, the C champions.

Venues
The games of the 2010 championship were played at five different locations and stadiums:
Casale sul Sile – Stadio Comunale Giovanni Eugenio
Conegliano – Stadio Comunale
San Donà di Piave – Stadio Mario e Romolo Pacifici
San Michele al Tagliamento – Impianto sportivo Malafesta
Treviso – Stadio Comunale di Monigo

Changes for 2011
The 2011 edition of the championship is scheduled to see a return of the absent three home nations, England, Scotland and Wales. For this purpose, the A division will be enlarged to twelve teams, while B and C remain at their current strength.

D Division
The D division forms the fourth level, below the C division, of European Under-18 rugby. In 2010, only four teams compete at this level, at a tournament held at Chișinău, Moldova, from 19 to 22 May 2010. It consists of the teams of Moldova, Israel, Croatia and Norway.

Teams and final standings
The participating teams and their final standings were:

Games
The results of the games:

A Division

Championship

Relegation

B Division

Championship

Relegation
The Switzerland versus Ukraine game was tied after regular time and was decided by penalty kicks.

C Division

Championship

Relegation
The Denmark versus Austria game was tied after regular time and was decided by penalty kicks.

D Division
Held at a different time and location as the other three divisions, in Moldova, these are the results:

References

External links
 FIRA-AER official website
  2010 European Under-18 Rugby Union Championship official website

2010
Europe
2009–10 in European rugby union
2009–10 in Italian rugby union
International rugby union competitions hosted by Italy
Rugby union